Lena is a village in Østre Toten Municipality in Innlandet county, Norway. The urban area of Lena also includes part of the village of Kraby, just to the east.

Lena is a commercial center for the municipality and is surrounded by mostly farmland. In central Lena, there are several shops and three schools (upper secondary, lower secondary, and primary schools). Toten folk high school is also located in Lean. The villages of Lensbygda and Skreia lie to the southeast, Kolbu is to the southwest, Sletta and Nordlia are to the northwest, and Kapp is to the northeast.

Name
The village name comes from the local river, Lenaelva, which flows from Totenåsen (a hilly, forested area north of Hurdal and Hadeland). The river travels through the villages of Lena and Skreia to the lake Mjøsa. In 1902 when the railway station was built, the station was named Lena (after the river) and since then the village area that grew up around the station became known as Lena. Lena Station was located along the Skreia Line from 1902 until its closure in 1987.

References

Østre Toten
Villages in Innlandet